Richard Collins (1755–1831) was a British miniature painter.

Life
Collins was born at Gosport in Hampshire, on 30 January 1755. He studied enamel-painting with Jeremias Meyer. In 1777, he exhibited some portraits at the Royal Academy.

He shared with Richard Cosway and Samuel Shelley the fashionable sitters of the day, and in 1789, was appointed principal portrait-painter in enamel to George III. He executed some fine miniature portraits of the royal family. Having acquired a comfortable income by his art, he left London in 1811, and retired at Pershore, Worcestershire, resigning his post in the royal service.

About 1828, however, the love of art and culture led Collins to return to London, and he resided in the vicinity of Regent's Park until his death on 5 August 1831.

Notes

References

External links

1755 births
1831 deaths
18th-century English painters
English male painters
19th-century English painters
Portrait miniaturists
People from Gosport
19th-century English male artists
18th-century English male artists